Dowlatabad-e Seh (also Romanized as Dowlatābād-e Seh; also known as Dowlatābād) is a village in Fathabad Rural District, in the Central District of Baft County, Kerman Province, Iran. At the 2006 census, its population was 17, in 4 families.

References 

Populated places in Baft County